Guangzhou Sunac Land Resort is a theme park in Huadu District, Guangzhou, China. It is north of the city center of Huadu and covers a total area of approximately 2.2 million square meters. It was designed and built by Wanda Group, but was sold to Sunac in 2017.
In June 2019, the Sunac Land Resort opened officially.

Guangzhou Sunac Land Resort consists of:
Guangzhou Sunac Land
Guangzhou Sunac Snow Park
Guangzhou Sunac Water Park
Guangzhou Sunac Sport Park

References

Operating amusement parks
Amusement parks in China
2019 establishments in China
Amusement parks opened in 2019
Huadu District
Tourist attractions in Guangzhou